Theophylact or Theophylactus (Latin: Theophylactus; Greek: Θεοφύλακτος Theophylaktos, "guarded by God") may refer to:

 Theophylact Simocatta (7th century), Byzantine author and historian
 Theophylactus (Exarch) (died 710), Exarch of Ravenna
 Patriarch Theophylactus of Alexandria (7th–8th centuries), coadjutor Greek Orthodox Patriarch of Alexandria
 Theophylact of Antioch (8th century), Greek Orthodox Patriarch of Antioch
 Archdeacon Theophylact (8th century), archdeacon of the Roman Church
 Peter of Atroa or Theophylact (773–837)
 Theophylact Rhangabe (8th century), Byzantine admiral
 Theophylact (son of Michael I) (793–849), Byzantine co-emperor
 Theophylact of Nicomedia (died 845), Bishop of Nicomedia
 Theophylact I, Count of Tusculum (9th–10th centuries)
 Theophylact of Constantinople (917–956), Patriarch of Constantinople
 Theophylact Dalassenos (10th–11th centuries)
 Theophylact Botaneiates (fl. died 1014)
 Pope Benedict VIII or Theophylactus (died 1024)
 Pope Benedict IX or Theophylactus (11th century)
 Theophylact of Ohrid (died c. 1107), Archbishop of Ohrid and biblical commentator
 Theophylaktos (died 1958), Metropolitan of Australia; see List of 20th-century religious leaders